Trương Thị Kim Tuyền (born 2 January 1997) is a Vietnamese taekwondo practitioner.

She won a silver medal in finweight at the 2017 World Taekwondo Championships, after being defeated by Sim Jae-young in the final. She won a bronze medal at the 2016 Asian Taekwondo Championships, and a gold medal at the 2018 Asian Taekwondo Championships and the 2021 Asian Taekwondo Championships.

References

External links

1997 births
Living people
Vietnamese female taekwondo practitioners
Taekwondo practitioners at the 2014 Asian Games
Taekwondo practitioners at the 2018 Asian Games
World Taekwondo Championships medalists
Asian Taekwondo Championships medalists
Asian Games competitors for Vietnam
People from Vĩnh Long province
Taekwondo practitioners at the 2020 Summer Olympics
21st-century Vietnamese women
Olympic taekwondo practitioners of Vietnam